Scottish Swimming, also known as the Scottish Amateur Swimming Association (SASA), is the national governing body for swimming, diving, water polo and synchronised swimming in Scotland. The SASA and the English and Welsh swimming associations form British Swimming, which is responsible for British teams at the Olympics, and other events in which the United Kingdom sends a combined team.

Founded in 1888, the SASA was incorporated as a limited company in 2003. It comprises four districts – North, Midlands, East and West and has 160 affiliated swimming clubs across the country.

It is based on the campus of the University of Stirling.

Sponsorship 

In 2009, British Swimming announced a £15 million, 6 year sponsorship deal with British Gas, to cover the Home Country Associations too.

References

External links 
 
Scottish Swim Meet Results Service
Scottish Masters Swimming
BBC Sport, Swimming Contacts:Scotland

Sports organizations established in 1888
1888 in Scottish sport
1888 establishments in Scotland
Swimming organizations
Sports governing bodies in Scotland
University of Stirling
Swimming in Scotland
Sport in Stirling (council area)